{{Infobox actor
|name       = Ralph James
|image      =
|image_size = 250px
|caption    =
|birth_name = Ralph James Torrez
|birth_date = November 29, 1924
|birth_place = Los Angeles County, California, U.S.
|death_date  = 
|death_place = Beverly Hills, California, U.S.
|occupation  = Actor, voice actor
|years_active = 1963–1985
|spouse       = 
|children     =
|known_for    = Voice of Orson on ABC-TV's Mork & Mindy TV series  Voice for various characters in Looney Tunes and Pink Panther cartoon shorts
}}
Ralph James Torrez (November 29, 1924 – March 14, 1992) was an American voice and character actor who lived in Los Angeles County, California.

Career
He did voices for the Looney Tunes and was the voice of Mr. Turtle in the commercials for Tootsie Pops which ran throughout the 1970s. From 1978 to 1982, he was the voice of Orson, Mork's (Robin Williams) boss on the Planet Ork, in Mork & Mindy (a Happy Days spin-off). In addition, he provided character voice overs in the Pink Panther cartoon shorts.  He also made several live acting appearances, including the action/sexploitation film Big Bad Mama, where he played the minor role of a sheriff, Capone (1975), where he played the part of Judge H.B. Wilkerson, and the part of "Ace" in Sixpack Annie (1975).

Death
On March 14, 1992, James died at the age of 67 in Beverly Hills.

Filmography

External links 
 
 

1924 births
1992 deaths
American male voice actors
20th-century American male actors